Ronald Mehlich (born 26 September 1969, in Strzelce Opolskie) is a retired Polish athlete who specialised in the sprint hurdles. He represented his country at the 1997 World Championships, as well as two World Indoor Championships.

He has personal bests of 13.44 seconds outdoors (Katowice 1997) and 7.61 seconds indoors (Valencia 1998).

His younger brother, Krzysztof, is also a former hurdler.

Competition record

References

1969 births
Living people
Polish male hurdlers
People from Strzelce Opolskie
World Athletics Championships athletes for Poland
Sportspeople from Opole Voivodeship
Competitors at the 1995 Summer Universiade
Competitors at the 1997 Summer Universiade
20th-century Polish people